The Danish Sport Shooting Association, Danish Dansk Sportsskytte Forbund (DSF), is the Danish association for practical shooting under the International Practical Shooting Confederation. DSF is also a member of Dansk Skytte Union (The Danish Shooting Union).

External links 
 Official homepage of Dansk Sportsskytte Forbund

References 

Regions of the International Practical Shooting Confederation
Shooting sports in Denmark
Sports organizations of Denmark